Peggy Goodenow Lemaux is an American plant biologist. She won a 2003 Dennis R. Hoagland Award.

She graduated from Miami University, and University of Michigan, She studied with Stan Cohen. She was a research scientist at DeKalb Genetics. She is a Professor of Cooperative Extension at the University of California, Berkeley. She won a grant from the Gates Foundation to study sorghum. She developed genetically modified varieties of barley, wheat and sorghum. She opposed an anti-GMO ballot initiative in California. She has several patents.

Works

References 

Living people
American women botanists
20th-century American botanists
20th-century American women scientists
21st-century American botanists
21st-century American women scientists
Miami University alumni
University of Michigan alumni
University of California, Berkeley people
Year of birth missing (living people)